Bankra Union is a union parishad of the Jessore District in the Division of Khulna, Bangladesh.

References

Unions of Jhikargacha Upazila
Unions of Jessore District
Unions of Khulna Division